Books.com.tw or Pok'elai, originally established as an online bookstore, is Taiwan's largest Internet retailer.

History
 1995: Terry Chang (Chinese: 張天立), who had graduated from National Taiwan University (math) and had had graduate study at Pennsylvania State University (computer) and Rutgers University (business), started the first online bookstore of the Taiwan-Mainland China-Hong Kong area, and established Pok'elai Digital Science & Technology Co., Ltd., by the year-end. This was within one year of the establishment of Amazon.com.  
 1996: Books.com.tw officially started its business. 
 2000: started "Order to Books.com.tw and receive/pay at Uni-President Enterprises Corporation's 7-Eleven store" service .
 2001: Uni-President Enterprises invested in Books.com.tw.
 2004: Simplified Chinese books, published in mainland China, were sold in addition to Traditional Chinese books, published in Taiwan.  
 2005: Yamato Transport's Tanwan subsidiary began to be used for delivery to the customers.
 2013: Listed as one of Taiwan's 100 Largest Companies for the fifth year. Exceeded five million customers (cumulative).
 2014: In Hong Kong, started "Order to Books.com.tw and receive/pay at Dairy Farm's 7-Eleven store" service.

Competitors
 YesAsia.com
 Sanmin Online Bookstore

See also
 Uni-President Enterprises Corporation
 Yamato Transport'
 Dairy Farm International Holdings

References

External links
 Official site 

Online retailers of  Taiwan
Book websites